Calymenidae is a family of trilobites, containing the following genera:

Alcymene
Apocalymene
Arcticalymene
Calymene
Calymenella
Calymenesum
Colpocoryphe
Dekalymene
Diacalymene
Flexicalymene
Gravicalymene
Limbocalymene
Linguocalymene
Liocalymene
Metacalymene
Neseuretinus
Neseuretus
Nipponocalymene
Onnicalymene
Papillicalymene
Paracalymene
Platycalymene
Pradoella
Protocalymene
Reacalymene
Reedocalymene
Salterocoryphe
Sarrabesia
Spathacalymene
Sthenarocalymene
Tapinocalymene
Thelecalymene
Vietnamia

References

 
Calymenina
Trilobite families